A chopstick rest is tableware, similar to a knife rest or a spoon rest, used to keep chopstick tips off the table and to prevent used chopsticks from contaminating or rolling off tables. Chopstick rests are found more commonly in restaurants than in homes. They come in various shapes and are made from clay, wood, plastic, metal, glass, porcelain or precious stones such as jade. If the chopsticks come in paper sleeves, some people fold the sleeves into chopstick rests.

In East Asia, chopstick rests are usually used at formal dinners. They are placed on the front-left side of the dishes, with the chopsticks parallel to the table edge and the points toward the left, or to the right side of the dishes, with the chopstick points towards to the front.

Gallery

See also
 Chopsticks
 Spoon rest
 Spoon and chopstick rest

Notes

External links

 Chopstick rest Collection, A collection of hashioki
 Chopstick rest stock photos and images, Fotosearch
 Erick's Chopstick Rests (Hashi Oki) Page
 Jen's Chopstick Rests Gallery
 Jurek Zarzycki's Chopstick Rests collection
 Chopstick rests, Asian Art Mall
 Unique Chopstick Rest

Eating utensils
Chinese cuisine
Korean cuisine
Japanese cuisine
Chinese inventions